The 2021 Texas Tech Red Raiders baseball team represented Texas Tech University during the 2021 NCAA Division I baseball season. The Red Raiders played their home games at Dan Law Field at Rip Griffin Park as a member of the Big 12 Conference. They were led by head coach Tim Tadlock, in his 9th season at Texas Tech.

On March 26, with a 16–6 win over South Florida, Tadlock became the program's second winningest coach with 318 wins.

Previous season

The 2020 Texas Tech Red Raiders baseball team notched a 16–3 record in February and early March; however, the remainder of the season was abruptly halted on March 13, 2020, when the Big 12 Conference canceled the remainder of the athletics season due to the Coronavirus pandemic.

Personnel

Coaching Staff

Roster

Schedule and results

! style="" | Regular Season (35–13)
|- valign="top" 

|- bgcolor="#ffbbbb"
| February 20 || 7:00 pm || FloSports || vs. #8 Arkansas* || #3 || Globe Life FieldArlington, TX || L9–13 || Trest(1–0) || Devine(0–1) || — || 16,908 || 0–1 || — || StatsStory
|- bgcolor="#ffbbbb"
| February 21 || 3:00 pm || FloSports || vs. #6 Ole Miss* || #3 || Globe Life FieldArlington, TX || L4–5 || Hoglund(1–0) || Dallas(0–1) || Forsyth(1) || 17,587 || 0–2 || — || StatsStory
|- bgcolor="#ffbbbb"
| February 22 || 11:00 am || FloSports || vs. #7 Mississippi State* || #3 || Globe Life FieldArlington, TX || L5–11 || Koestler(1–0) || Hitt(0–1) || — || 13,659 || 0–3 || — || StatsStory
|- bgcolor="#bbffbb"
| February 26 || 2:00 pm || ESPN+ || Houston Baptist* || #10 || Dan Law FieldLubbock, TX || W18–3(7) || Birdsell(1–0) || Zarella(0–1) || — || 2,270 || 1–3 || — || StatsStory
|- bgcolor="#bbffbb"
| February 27 || 2:00 pm || ESPN+ || Houston Baptist* || #10 || Dan Law FieldLubbock, TX || W8–1 || Monteverde(1–0) || Coats(0–1) || — || 2,270 || 2–3 || — || StatsStory
|- bgcolor="#bbffbb"
| February 28 || 1:00 pm || ESPN+ || Houston Baptist* || #10 || Dan Law FieldLubbock, TX || W11–2 || Montgomery(1–0) || Spinney(0–1) || — || 2,270 || 3–3 || — || StatsStory
|-

|- bgcolor="#bbffbb"
| March 2 || 3:00 pm ||  || * || #10 || Dan Law FieldLubbock, TX || W14–2 || Dallas(1–1) || Armstrong(0–2) || — || 1,808 || 4–3 || — || StatsStory
|- bgcolor="#bbffbb"
| March 3 || 1:00 pm || ESPN+ || Texas Southern* || #10 || Dan Law FieldLubbock, TX || W15–0(7) || Hampton(1–0) || Olguin(0–1) || — || 1,808 || 5–3 || — || StatsStory
|- bgcolor="#bbffbb"
| March 5 || 7:00 pm || AT&T SN SW || vs. Texas State* || #10 || Minute Maid ParkHouston, TX || W8–4 || Key(1–0) || Leigh(0–2) || — || 2,197 || 6–3 || — || StatsStory
|- bgcolor="#bbffbb"
| March 6 || 3:00 pm || AT&T SN SW || vs. Sam Houston State* || #10 || Minute Maid ParkHouston, TX || W8–0 || Monteverde(2–0) || Dillard(0–2) || — || 3,129 || 7–3 || — || StatsStory
|- bgcolor="#bbffbb"
| March 7 || 11:00 am || AT&T SN SW || vs. TAMU–CC* || #10 || Minute Maid ParkHouston, TX || W4–3 || Queen(1–0) || Thomas(0–1) || Sublette(1) ||  || 8–3 || — || StatsStory
|- bgcolor="#bbffbb"
| March 9 || 6:30 pm || ESPN+ || * || #9 || Dan Law FieldLubbock, TX || W5–4 || Wells(1–0) || Zeglin(1–1) || Girton(1) || 2,270 || 9–3 || — || StatsStory
|- bgcolor="#bbffbb"
| March 10 || 6:30 pm || ESPN+ || Gonzaga* || #9 || Dan Law FieldLubbock, TX || W5–4 || Sublette(1–0) || Vrieling(0–2) || Queen(1) || 1,949 || 10–3 || — || StatsStory
|- bgcolor="#bbffbb"
| March 12 || 2:00 pm || ESPN+ || UConn* || #9 || Dan Law FieldLubbock, TX || W4–3 || Birdsell(2–0) || Casparius(1–2) || Queen(2) || 3,031 || 11–3 || — || StatsStory
|- bgcolor="#bbffbb"
| March 13 || 2:00 pm || ESPN+ || UConn* || #9 || Dan Law FieldLubbock, TX || W10–3 || Monteverde(3–0) || Simeone(0–2) || — || 3,538 || 12–3 || — || StatsStory
|- bgcolor="#bbffbb"
| March 14 || 2:00 pm || ESPN+ || UConn* || #9 || Dan Law FieldLubbock, TX || W15–13 || Sublette(2–0) || Peterson(1–1) || Queen(3) || 3,378 || 13–3 || — || StatsStory
|- bgcolor="#bbffbb"
| March 15 || 10:00 am || ESPN+ || UConn* || #7 || Dan Law FieldLubbock, TX || W9–8(10) || Girton(1–0) || Wurster(2–1) || — || 2,782 || 14–3 || — || StatsStory
|- bgcolor="#ffbbbb"
| March 19 || 6:30 pm || ESPN+ || #14 Oklahoma State || #7 || Dan Law FieldLubbock, TX || L0–2 || Scott(4–1) || Birdsell(2–1) || Standlee(3) || 4,432 || 14–4 || 0–1 || StatsStory
|- bgcolor="#bbffbb"
| March 20 || 2:00 pm || ESPN+ || #14 Oklahoma State || #7 || Dan Law FieldLubbock, TX || W4–2 || Monteverde(4–0) || Wrobleski(1–2) || Dallas(1) || 4,432 || 15–4 || 1–1 || StatsStory
|- bgcolor="#bbffbb"
| March 21 || 2:00 pm || ESPN+ || #14 Oklahoma State || #7 || Dan Law FieldLubbock, TX || W6–5 || Sublette(3–0) || Osmond(2–1) || Bridges(1) || 3,733 || 16–4 || 2–1 || StatsStory
|- bgcolor="#bbffbb"
| March 26 || 6:30 pm || ESPN+ || * || #6 || Dan Law FieldLubbock, TX || W16–6 || Birdsell(3–1) || Jasiak(2–3) || — || 3,785 || 17–4 || — || StatsStory
|- bgcolor="#bbffbb"
| March 27 || 2:00 pm || ESPN+ || South Florida* || #6 || Dan Law FieldLubbock, TX || W8–0 || Monteverde(5–0) || Burns(1–3) || — || 4,107 || 18–4 || — || StatsStory
|- bgcolor="#bbffbb"
| March 28 || 1:00 pm || ESPN+ || South Florida* || #6 || Dan Law FieldLubbock, TX || W7–4 || Devine(1–0) || Kerkering(2–1) || Hampton(1) || 3,008 || 19–4 || — || StatsStory
|-

|- bgcolor="#bbffbb"
| April 1 || 6:00 pm || ESPN+ || at Kansas State || #4 || Tointon Family StadiumManhattan, KS || W17–1 || Birdsell(4–1) || Wicks(4–2) || — || 404 || 20–4 || 3–1 || StatsStory
|- bgcolor="#ffbbbb"
| April 2 || 6:00 pm || ESPN+ || at Kansas State || #4 || Tointon Family StadiumManhattan, KS || L2–7 || Seymour(2–2) || Monteverde(5–1) || Eckberg(4) || 587 || 20–5 || 3–2 || StatsStory
|- bgcolor="#ffbbbb"
| April 3 || 4:00 pm || ESPN+ || at Kansas State || #4 || Tointon Family StadiumManhattan, KS || L4–10 || McCullough(2–1) || Montgomery(1–1) || — || 587 || 20–6 || 3–3 || StatsStory
|- bgcolor="#ffbbbb"
| April 9 || 6:30 pm || ESPN+ || #10 TCU || #8 || Dan Law FieldLubbock, TX || L3–7 || Smith(6–1) || Dallas(1–2) || — || 4,432 || 20–7 || 3–4 || Stats
|- bgcolor="#bbffbb"
| April 10 || 2:00 pm || ESPN+ || #10 TCU || #8 || Dan Law FieldLubbock, TX || W6–5(10) || Sublette(4–0) || Ridings(1–1) || — || 4,432 || 21–7 || 4–4 || StatsStory
|- bgcolor="#bbffbb"
| April 11 || 12:00 pm || ESPN+ || #10 TCU || #8 || Dan Law FieldLubbock, TX || W17–7(7) || Key(2–0) || Ray(2–2) || — || 3,896 || 22–7 || 5–4 || StatsStory
|- bgcolor="#bbffbb"
| April 13 || 6:30 pm || ESPN+ || Stephen F. Austin* || #8 || Dan Law FieldLubbock, TX || W4–3 || Webster(1–0) || Lee(1–1) || — || 3,516 || 23–7 || — || StatsStory
|- bgcolor="#bbffbb"
| April 14 || 1:00 pm || ESPN+ || Stephen F. Austin* || #8 || Dan Law FieldLubbock, TX || W7–5 || Riechman(1–0) || Roth(0–1) || Queen(4) || 2,959 || 24–7 || — || StatsStory
|-  bgcolor="#bbffbb"
| April 16 || 5:30 pm || ESPN+ || at  || #8 || Mon. County BallparkGranville, WV || W7–2 || Monteverde(6–1) || Wolf(3–4) || — || 600 || 25–7 || 6–4 || StatsStory
|- bgcolor="ffbbbb"
| April 17 || 3:00 pm || ESPN+ || at West Virginia || #8 || Mon. County BallparkGranville, WV || L5–6 || Watters(2–0) || Sublette(4–1) || — || 600 || 25–8 || 6–5 || StatsStory
|- bgcolor="bbffbb"
| April 18 || 12:00 pm || ESPN+ || at West Virginia || #8 || Mon. County BallparkGranville, WV || W10–1 || Montgomery(2–1) || Hampton(3–1) || — || 600 || 26–8 || 7–5 || StatsStory
|- style="background:#bbb"
| April 20 || 6:30 pm || ESPNU || vs.  || #5 || HodgetownAmarillo, TX || colspan=8| Postponed to May 4
|- bgcolor="ffbbbb"
| April 23 || 6:30 pm || ESPN+ || Baylor || #5 || Dan Law FieldLubbock, TX || L4–12 || Thomas(5–2) || Monteverde(6–2) || — || 4,432 || 26–9 || 7–6 || StatsStory
|- bgcolor="bbffbb"
| April 24 || 2:00 pm || ESPN+ || Baylor || #5 || Dan Law FieldLubbock, TX || W4–1 || Sublette(5–1) || Winston(6–3) || — || 4,432 || 27–9 || 8–6 || StatsStory
|- bgcolor="ffbbbb"
| April 25 || 2:00 pm || ESPN+ || Baylor || #5 || Dan Law FieldLubbock, TX || L3–13 || Helton(3–2) || Montgomery(2–2) || — || 4,031 || 27–10 || 8–7 || StatsStory
|- bgcolor="bbffbb"
| April 28 || 12:00 pm || ESPN+ ||  || #11 || Dan Law FieldLubbock, TX || W10–4 || Girton(2–0) || Garley(0–2) || — || 2,967 || 28–10 || — || StatsStory
|- bgcolor="bbffbb"
| April 30 || 2:00 pm || LHN || at #3 Texas || #11 || UFCU Disch–Falk FieldAustin, TX || W6–3 || Sublette(6–1) || Madden(6–2) || Queen(5) || 1,902 || 29–10 || 9–7 || StatsStory
|-

|- bgcolor="bbffbb"
| May 1 || 12:00 pm || LHN || at #3 Texas || #11 || UFCU Disch–Falk FieldAustin, TX || W5–3 || Dallas(2–0) || Stevens(7–2) || Sublette(2) || 2,163 || 30–10 || 10–7 || StatsStory
|- bgcolor="ffbbbb"
| May 2 || 2:30 pm || LHN || at #3 Texas || #11 || UFCU Disch–Falk FieldAustin, TX || L3–11 || Hansen(5–1) || Montgomery(2–3) || — || 2,457 || 30–11 || 10–8 || StatsStory
|- bgcolor="bbffbb"
| May 4 || 6:00 pm || ESPN+ || vs. Oklahoma* || #8 || HodgetownAmarillo, TX || W14–4 || Hampton(2–0) || Christian(0–1) || — || 6,898 || 31–11 || — || StatsStory
|- style="background:#bbb"
| May 7 || 6:30 pm || ESPN+ || * || #8 || Dan Law FieldLubbock, TX || colspan=8| Canceled
|- style="background:#bbb"
| May 8 || 12:00 pm || ESPN+ || UIC* || #8 || Dan Law FieldLubbock, TX || colspan=8| Canceled 
|- style="background:#bbb"
| May 8 || 4:00 pm || ESPN+ || UIC* || #8 || Dan Law FieldLubbock, TX || colspan=8| Canceled
|- style="background:#bbb"
| May 9 || 1:00 pm || ESPN+ || UIC* || #8 || Dan Law FieldLubbock, TX || colspan=8| Canceled 
|- bgcolor="ffbbbb"
| May 14 || 6:30 pm || SoonerSports || at Oklahoma || #7 || Mitchell ParkNorman, OK || L8–9(10) || Olds(4–5) || Sublette(6–2) || — || 849 || 31–12 || 10–9 || StatsStory
|- bgcolor="bbffbb"
| May 15 || 2:00 pm || BSO || at Oklahoma || #7 || Mitchell ParkNorman, OK || W15–2 || Dallas(3–2) || Carmichael(6–2) || Queen(6) || 482 || 32–12 || 11–9 || StatsStory
|- bgcolor="bbffbb"
| May 16 || 2:00 pm || SoonerSports || at Oklahoma || #7 || Mitchell ParkNorman, OK || W13–2(7) || Montgomery(3–3) || Taggart(1–6) || — || 480 || 33–12 || 12–9 || StatsStory
|- bgcolor="ffbbbb"
| May 20 || 6:30 pm || ESPN+ ||  || #5 || Dan Law FieldLubbock, TX || L4–7 || Barry(2–2) || Sublette(6–3) || Ulane(11) || 3,323 || 33–13 || 12–10 || StatsStory
|- bgcolor="bbffbb"
| May 21 || 6:30 pm || ESPN+ || Kansas || #5 || Dan Law FieldLubbock, TX || W13–4 || Dallas(4–2) || Davis(6–6) || — || 3,222 || 34–13 || 13–10 || StatsStory
|- bgcolor="bbffbb"
| May 22 || 1:00 pm || ESPN+ || Kansas || #5 || Dan Law FieldLubbock, TX || W5–0 || Hampton(3–0) || Hazelwood(2–4) || — || 3,859 || 35–13 || 14–10 || StatsStory
|-

|-
! style="" | Post-season (4–4)
|- valign="top" 

|- bgcolor="bbffbb"
| May 26 || 9:00 am || ESPNU || vs. (6) Baylor || #5 (3) || Bricktown BallparkOklahoma City, OK || W11–4 || Montgomery(4–3) || Caley(2–2) || — || 3,756 || 36–13 || 1–0 || StatsStory
|- bgcolor="ffbbbb"
| May 28 || 9:00 am || ESPN+ || vs. #15 (2) TCU || #5 (3) || Bricktown BallparkOklahoma City, OK || L2–7 || Smith(7–3) || Monteverde(6–3) || Green(12) || 3,812 || 36–14 || 1–1 || StatsStory
|- bgcolor="ffbbbb"
| May 28 || 12:45 pm || ESPN+ || vs. (7) Kansas State || #5 (3) || Bricktown BallparkOklahoma City, OK || L2–7 || Eckberg(5–5) || Dallas(4–3) || — || 3,983 || 36–15 || 1–2 || StatsStory
|-

|- bgcolor="bbffbb"
| June 4 || 11:00 am || ESPNU || (4)  || #9 (1) || Dan Law FieldLubbock, TX || W6–3 || Hampton(4–0) || Loricco(4–2) || Dallas(2) || 4,606 || 37–15 || 1–0 || StatsStory
|- bgcolor="bbffbb"
| June 5 || 8:00 pm || ESPN2 || (3) North Carolina || #9 (1) || Dan Law FieldLubbock, TX || W7–2 || Monteverde(7–3) || Rapp(1–2) || Sublette(3) || 4,737 || 38–15 || 2–0 || StatsStory
|- bgcolor="bbffbb"
| June 6 || 6:00 pm || ESPN3 || #21 (2) UCLA || #9 (1) || Dan Law FieldLubbock, TX || W8–2 || Montgomery(5–3) || Mora(2–2) || — || 4,737 || 39–15 || 3–0 || StatsStory
|- bgcolor="ffbbbb"
| June 11 || 2:00 pm || ESPNU || #7 Stanford || #9 || Dan Law FieldLubbock, TX || L3–15 || Beck(9–1) || Hampton(4–1) || — || 4,732 || 39–16 || 3–1 || StatsStory
|- bgcolor="ffbbbb"
| June 12 || 2:00 pm || ESPNU || #7 Stanford || #9 || Dan Law FieldLubbock, TX || L0–9 || Williams(4–2) || Monteverde(7–4) || — || 4,732 || 39–17 || 3–2 || StatsStory
|-

| style="font-size:88%"| Legend:       = Win       = Loss       = Canceled      Bold = Texas Tech team member
|-
| style="font-size:88%"| "*" indicates a non-conference game."#" represents ranking. All rankings from D1Baseball on the date of the contest."()" represents postseason seeding in the Big 12 Tournament or NCAA Regional, respectively.

Rankings

Players drafted into the MLB

Notes

References

External links
2021 Team Roster

Texas Tech Red Raiders
Texas Tech Red Raiders baseball seasons
Texas Tech Red Raiders baseball
Texas Tech